Gerhard (fl946) was from 932 to 946 the 14th Bishop of Passau. Gerhard was perhaps Abbot of Metten, and was probably elevated to Bishop of Passau by Arnulf, Duke of Bavaria. He was regarded as a pious, virtuous, and erudite bishop, whom the annals of Reichersberg called saints. Probably he undertook a trip to Rome in 937.

References

Year of birth unknown
10th-century bishops in Bavaria
Roman Catholic bishops of Passau